Steven Kolb is the chief executive officer of the Council of Fashion Designers of America (CFDA), a group of 477 American fashion womenswear, menswear, jewelry, and accessories designers. Born in Passaic, New Jersey, Kolb holds a Masters in Public Administration from New York University and an honorary doctorate of the Arts from Kendall College of Art and Design at Ferris State University in Grand Rapids, Michigan.  The Business of Fashion ranks Kolb as one of 500 people shaping the global fashion industry. In 2018 and 2012, he was named to the Out100 list, a celebration of the most influential LGBTQ people of the year.

References

Living people
American chief executives of fashion industry companies
Robert F. Wagner Graduate School of Public Service alumni
Year of birth missing (living people)